Juliette Welfling is a French film editor. She was nominated for the Academy Award for Best Film Editing for her work in the 2007 movie The Diving Bell and the Butterfly. She has received the César Award for Best Editing for her work on this film as well as for five Jacques Audiard films: Regarde les hommes tomber (1994), The Beat That My Heart Skipped (2005), A Prophet (2009), Rust and Bone (2012), and The Sisters Brothers (2018).

Filmography
Feature films
 See How They Fall (1994)
 A Self Made Hero (1996)
 Déjà mort (1998)
 Read My Lips (2001)
 Aram (2002)
 The Beat That My Heart Skipped (2005)
 The Science of Sleep (2006)
 I Do (2006)
 The Diving Bell and the Butterfly (2007)
 A Simple Heart (2008)
 A Prophet (2009)
 The Big Picture (2010)
 Miral (2010)
 Love and Bruises (2011)
 Rust and Bone (2012)
 The Hunger Games (2012)
 The Past (2013)
 Far from Men (2014)
 Dheepan (2015)
 Free State of Jones (2016)
 Ocean's 8 (2018)
 The Sisters Brothers (2018)

References

External links
 

French film editors
Living people
1956 births
French women film editors